Bass is an unincorporated community in  Casey County, Kentucky, United States.

References

Unincorporated communities in Casey County, Kentucky
Unincorporated communities in Kentucky